Salvatore Antonio "Rino" Gaetano (29 October 1950 – 2 June 1981) was an Italian musician and singer-songwriter. He is famous for his satirical songs and oblique yet incisive political commentary. He is remembered for his raspy voice, for the heavily ironic lyrics of his songs and his social protests. He died in a car accident at age 30. He was a popular and influential figure, widely re-evaluated by the following teen generations.

Biography
Salvatore Antonio Gaetano was born in Crotone, Calabria.  
In March 1960, at the age of ten, his family moved to Rome, where he would spend the rest of his life. In 1961, he was sent to study at the seminary Piccola Opera del Sacro Cuore of Narni, in the province of Terni, where under the guidance of his teacher Renato Simeoni, he began to show his flair for writing poetry. By 1967 he had finished school and living back in Rome, he created a quartet with a group of friends called Krounks, who would mainly play cover songs. They were inspired by Italian artists such as Enzo Jannacci, Fabrizio De André, Adriano Celentano, I Gufi,  and Ricky Gianco as well as international musicians such as Bob Dylan and The Beatles.

In 1969, Gaetano approached Folkstudio, a well-known club in Rome for promoting young artists. His style proved to be very different from that of the other musicians. His strong use of irony caused concerns for the club managers, as he recounted:

"When I sang at Folkstudio, it was the centre of discussions....in fact they did not want me to do many of my pieces because they thought I wanted to make fun of everyone."

However, Gaetano was a multi-talented performer and during the early 1970s, in addition to gigging, he performed in cabarets and took part in several plays including playing the role of Estragon in Samuel Beckett's Waiting for Godot, the Fox in a production of Pinocchio by Italian director Carmelo Bene and reciting poetry by Majakovsky.

Gaetano was an accomplished actor and it was through his theatre experience that he developed much of his subsequent stage style and writing technique. He was inspired by German kabarett, a form of theatre that excels in political satire. Wikipedia describes this as "unlike comedians who make fun of all kind of things, Kabarett artists (German: Kabarettisten) pride themselves as dedicated almost completely to political and social topics of more serious nature which they criticize using techniques like cynicism, sarcasm and irony." They were able to deal with social themes and political developments through their acts, something that inspired Gaetano and can be seen in many of his concepts and staging, for example, in his song  regarding the oil crisis of the 1970s. It enabled him to make political observations while avoiding censorship. Gaetano cited Ionesco as his favourite playwright, one of the foremost writers of Theatre of the Absurd, saying that he explored the usual problem of the inability to truly communicate, isolation and exclusion. He developed a comedy act with his friend Bruno Francelleschi, 'Ad esempio a me piace...' (For example, I like...), as a mixture of theatre and music.

In addition to his performing, Gaetano studied accountancy, encouraged by his father to pursue a secure career in banking. Gaetano asked for one more year to break into music and in 1972, he recorded his first 45 rpm record with the Milan-based Produttori Associati containing the songs "Jacqueline" and "La ballata di Renzo", a song which features lyrics that echo details of his own death. The disc was not printed and Gaetano signed with Vincenzo Micocci, releasing his first single in 1973,  (with "Jaqueline" on the B-side) produced by RosVeMon, the surnames of Aurelio Rossitto, Antonello Venditti and Piero Montanari. In this song, Gaetano exhibits his multicultural education, singing in four languages – English, Italian, German and French. Rino decided to release the single under the pseudonym of Kammamuri's as tribute to a character in Pirates of Malaysia by Emilio Salgari. According to Micocci the choice of using a pseudonym was a sign of shyness and insecurity of Gaetano:

"He considered himself a writer, not a singer. He believed he didn't have a good voice, so that after the release of I Love You Marianna, when the time came to record his first album, he came and told me that it would be better to get someone else to sing the songs. I, of course, I laughed and sent him in the studio."

In 1974, he published his first album, . The LP featured many of the themes that would characterise his work, such as issues of isolation, marginalisation and exclusion, as well as his lively style and intelligent, witty lyrics. His songs began to be played on radio stations and in the same year, through record company RCA, Gaetano wrote three songs for Nicola Di Bari "Prova a chiamarmi amore", "Questo amore così grande" and "Ad esempio a me piace... il Sud", included in the album Ti fa bella l'amore. The Spanish version of "Ad esempio a me piace... il Sud", "Por ejemplo", achieved success in Latin America.

Success for Gaetano came the following year with the 45 rpm hit record "" ("But the sky is always bluer"), perhaps now the most famous and instantly recognisable of his songs. Unusually, the 45 contained only one song, but it was split into two. In this song Gaetano offers several pictures of everyday life, with irony, clichés and contradictions. In September 1975, the singer explained some of this thinking in an article in the weekly Italian music magazine, : "These pictures are sad, never happy, because I wanted to emphasise that nowadays there are few cheerful things and it is for this reason that I take into account those who die at work. Even the verse "who plays Sanremo" is sad and negative, because anyone who plays Sanremo, doesn't think of those who "live in barracks".

Mio fratello è figlio unico and Aida 
In 1976 Gaetano recorded his second album, Mio fratello è figlio unico (My Brother is an Only Child). With this album, he tries to capture the listener's attention with dramatic narratives, especially loneliness and alienation, the main themes of the album. On the album, Gaetano began to explore new sounds and instruments including the sitar, the banjo and the mandolin, enabling him to obtain a more complex and mature album. In a review published by Ciao 2001 shortly after the album's release, it states that:

"His second album, Mio fratello è figlio unico, already widely programmed by radio stations, is much more mature and personal than his previous album. Gaetano is an atypical figure: there is the difficulty of finding genres to fit him into, trends in which to place him, which is the best compliment that you can give. The music, made a few chords, is built intelligently and pleasantly. The voice is aggressive, deliberately crude words are fun, the lyrics have allegories, the visual images are faster, like photography." (Enzo Caffarelli)

The following year Gaetano recorded his third album, . The choice of the name refers to the work of the great Italian opera composer Giuseppe Verdi, but for Gaetano, Aida is the embodiment of all women and of Italy itself. Through the figure of Aida, Rino researches and recounts moments in Italian history with a completely original, almost photographic, observation. While on tour, Gaetano was joined by the emerging band, Crash, and he produced their album Exstasis and wrote their song "Marziani noi" (Us Martians). With his increasing rise in popularity, he made his first major television appearance on the entertainment programme, Domenica in (Sunday), presented by the legendary Italian TV presenter Corrado Mantoni, singing "" and on 19 August, he was invited to appear on a programme with Gino Paoli where he famously appeared bearing a petrol pump and wearing a striped T-shirt and a colonial style safari hat.

Sanremo Music Festival 
Although not generally recognised outside of Italy, the Sanremo Music Festival is a popular annual song contest. Due to its pop music roots and pop culture positioning, it was not felt to be a route for a serious musician. However, pressure from RCA encouraged Gaetano to take part. He chose his new song . It was a highly innovative half-sung/ half-spoken proto-rap against several Italian sportsmen, politicians and other high-profile figures. However, the producers of the show forced him to drop the song, due to its now famous list of prominent Italians which it criticised, and swap the song with  On 26 January 1978, Gaetano appeared on stage at Sanremo wearing a top hat, evening dress featuring medals, red and white sneakers and bearing a ukulele. The performance of Gianna, also included the first time the word 'sex' was used onstage at Sanremo. Towards the end of the song, the band  appeared unexpectedly onstage to sing the chorus.

Later discussing his performance at Sanremo, Gaetano remarked:	
"The festival is a walkway and like all walkways, it gives you three minutes to make a speech that you would normally do in a two hour show. So you have to find a way. For my part, I have chosen the way of paradox, a bit like Carmelo Bene." (Rino vive – Ma il cielo è sempre più blu, RAI 2, 2007)

Bruno Franceschelli recalls the event:
"The performance in Sanremo, from my point of view, was a demonstration of his talent as an artist. He brought a new air, funny and irreverent, and once again demonstrated his free spirit, free to laugh and joke on the 'sacred soil' of Sanremo."

The song went on to dominate the charts for several weeks. It remained in the Top Ten for 14 weeks and sold over 600,000 copies. A version of the song in German was released by Wolfgang Petry.

Nuntereggae più and controversy 

In the same year Gaetano appeared on Rai Radio 1 radio programme Canzone d'Autore (Songwriters). During the programme, emerging musicians are invited to comment on their own songs. The programme was called "E cantava le canzoni", a title taken from the fourth album of the singer.

On the same album is the now notorious "Nuntereggae più", and Gaetano was asked to discuss it because of the numerous political references and the long list of names in the lyrics. He replied, "The songs are not political texts and I do not make speeches. This is just teasing. So, for me, "Nuntereggae più" is the lightest song I've ever done ".

Some verses of the song contain lists of names of people who at that time were prominent on the radio, television and newspapers. Some of the names included in the first version were deleted or replaced. For example, in the original version, written before his kidnapping, appeared the name of Aldo Moro. As a result of subsequent events, the name was later deleted from the text of the song, so as to avoid creating controversy. But other names were also deleted including the journalist Indro Montanelli, the actor Lino Banfi, Sinatra, Michele Sindona (Italian banker and convicted criminal) and the president of the Italian defence company Finmeccanica Camillo Crociani who was involved in the Lockheed scandal and the illegal Masonic Propaganda Due (P2) lodge. [41] Vincenzo Mollica recalls:
"'Nuntereggae' is a song of great fun, but [Gaetano] had the courage of his actions, he never drew back."

In that year Gaetano participated in a tour and some evening events, the most famous of these is definitely Discomare '78 and specifically the final night held in the Valley of the Temples in Agrigento on 23 August 1978. The singer was supposed to sing Nuntereggae more, but Rai tries to stop him and Rino in protest leaves the event. In October Rino goes to Madrid to record the Spanish version of the 45 Nuntereggae more. The title chosen is "Corta el rollo ya" (cut it out) and the singer adapts the text by inserting characters of Spanish politics and entertainment as Carrillo, Pirri and Susan Estrada. The album will be released in the spring and get some success.

Final albums 

1979 sees the release of Gaetano's fifth studio album,  and his first with RCA. Rino took part in his first Festivalbar and then, in October, he attended the Discoestate in Rieti. On this occasion, in protest at having to sing along to playback, when the music starts, instead of pretending to sing, he decides to act indifferent and smokes a cigarette.

Also in 1979, during a concert on the beach in Capocotta (in fact also mentioned in the lyrics), before singing Nuntereggae più, Gaetano is said:
"There's someone who wants to put a gag on me! I do not fear them! They will not succeed! I feel that, in the future, my songs will be sung by future generations, that, thanks to mass communication, they will understand what I mean tonight! They will understand and open their eyes, rather than having them full of salt! And you wonder what happened on the beach Capocotta." Gaetano was referring to the murder of Wilma Montesi.

In 1980, he recorded his final album  noted for its serious tone and rock sound. In 1981, RCA organised a tour, from which the live  album was created. In 1981, he also played the role of the Fox from Pinocchio in a movie directed by Carmelo Bene and filmed in Rome.

Death 

On 8 January 1981 Gaetano was involved in a head-on collision when an off-road vehicle drove the wrong way along the road and pinned Gaetano's Volvo 343 against the guardrail; the singer was unharmed while his car was completely destroyed. Gaetano then bought a new Volvo 343, in metallic gray. On 31 May 1981 he made his last appearance on TV singing E io ci sto.
 
On 2 June, at about 3 am, Gaetano was returning home alone in his Volvo 343. At 3.55 am, while along Rome's Via Nomentana, at the intersection of Viale XXI Aprile, he was in a head-on collision with a truck. The front and right side of the Volvo were destroyed. When help arrived, Rino was already in a coma and at the hospital, an x-ray showed a fracture at the base of the skull, various wounds to the forehead, a fractured right molar and a suspected fracture of the sternum. However, the clinic did not have a department for cranial injuries and the doctor on duty, Dr. Novelli, tried in vain to contact another hospital with a cranial trauma department. He contacted by phone St. John, St. Camillus, the CTO of Garbatella, the Policlinico Gemelli and San Filippo Neri, but could not get any assistance. At 6 am, Rino Gaetano died. There was a great deal of controversy about this accident, because of the failure of any of the contacted hospitals to help Gaetano and thus, an investigation was launched.

On 4 June his funeral was held in the Church of the Sacred Heart of Jesus, in which Gaetano had planned to get married. His funeral was attended by many relatives, friends, members of the music industry, RCA executives and fans. Initially he was buried in the small cemetery of Mentana, but on 17 October his body was transferred to the Verano cemetery, where it remains.

In recent years, the lyrics of the unpublished song "La ballata di Renzo" ("The Ballad of Renzo") has drawn a lot of attention – a song written by Rino more than ten years before his death. This song tells the story of a boy named Renzo, who died under similar circumstances. Renzo is hit by a car and dies after being rejected by many hospitals in Rome for lack of space, while his friends are at the bar. The song even references three of the hospitals that refused to treat Gaetano on 2 June 1981 due to lack of beds: General Hospital, San Giovanni and San Camillo. This is a topic of popular discussion. Gaetano's death was discussed on 27 November 2007 in a short radio program broadcast on Radio DeeJay by Carlo Lucarelli, who uses a writer-documentary narrative form to reconstruct unsolved crimes related to the world of music.
But the death of Rino Gaetano, too similar in terms of modality, to the words of his unpublished song almost seems like a signature left by some powerful secret organization that was ridiculed precisely in the lyrics of all his musical pieces.
In one of his books, the criminal lawyer Bruno Mautone hypothesizes that the death of Rino Gaetano was not a random event at all, but that, on the contrary, it was a murder organized by the deviant Italian secret services, probably commissioned by US counterparts, as the songs of the Calabrian singer-songwriter listed names, and facts that should have remained secret. For example, in the song "E Berta filava" ("And Bertha spun") Rino Gaetano spoke about Lockheed bribery scandals two years before its discovery, just as the apparently innocuous text of the song "Gianna" ("Johanna",  is the female name of the then president of the Italian republic, Govanni Leone, who resigned only three months after the presentation of the song) would not refer to the representation of the imaginary of the person with his own ideals and illusory ideologies, who, in order not to give up all the comforts that life allows, instead renounces his ideas , to his convictions, but would metaphorically denounce Italian politics made up of compromises, subterfuges, betrayals, lies, theft. But even more explicit are the names contained in the list present in the song "Nuntereggaeppiù", all belonging to the secret Masonic lodge Propaganda Due, implicated in many scandals and unclear events in Italian politics (attempted coups in 1964 "Piano Solo" and 1970 "Golpe Borghese", secret financings from the CIA to Italian political parties, Strategy of tension, killing of inconvenient witnesses such as the bandit Salvatore Giuliano, the investigative journalist Mauro De Mauro, the poet and film director Pier Paolo Pasolini, Wilma Montesi, the singer Luigi Tenco, or the manager Enrico Mattei, inconvenient witnesses who will be killed years after the song's publication such as Carmine Pecorelli, Roberto Calvi, Michele Sindona, and so on). The title of the song is already a program because it plays on a double meaning of the Italian language. In fact italian verb "reggere" means "to endure", "to stand", and in the first person of the indicative mood and of the present tense sounds similar to the word "Reggae", so the title "Nuntereggaeppiù", a non-existent word in Italian, sounds like a classic exclamation "I can't bear you more". According to the author, the source of Gaetano's revelations would have been a very dear friend of his, Enrico Carnevali, an agent of the Italian secret services belonging to the "Operation Gladio" organization, who died a few months later in a road accident "which occurred at equal to Rino, on the Nomentana". Indeed, in one of his last songs "E io ci sto" ("And I agree"), Rino Gaetano explicitly speaks of the pressure they give him and heralds his own death and future re-evaluation of his songs

It must be said that Mautone's remains only a hypothesis, for which there is no supporting evidence.

The first book on his life, also the first official biography, was published in 2001, 20 years after his death. In 2020, the Italian postal service dedicated a stamp to him for the seventieth anniversary of his birth.

Discography

Studio albums
  (1974)
  (1976)
  (1977)
  (1978)
  (1979)
  (1980)

Live albums
  (1981, with Riccardo Cocciante and New Perigeo)

Compilations
  (1990; includes the previously unreleased "Solo con io" and "Le beatitudini")
  (1993)
  (1996)
  (1998)
  (2003, 2005)
  (2007)
 The Essential Rino Gaetano (2008)
  (2009, with some unpublished tracks)
  (2010)

Singles
  (1973)
  (1974)
  (1975)
  (1976)
  (1976)
  (1977)
  (1977)
  (1978)
  (1978)
  (1979)
  (1980)
 Solo con io (1980)
 Le beatitudini (1981)

In popular culture
 Rino Gaetano. Ma il cielo è sempre più blu – Raifiction, 2007
 My Brother Is an Only Child (Mio fratello è figlio unico) – Italian film directed by Daniele Luchetti. The title of the film is taken from the famous Gaetano hit song of the same name.

Sources

Further reading

 Rino Gaetano (La Vita, le canzoni, le poesie e l'ironia di un grande artista) by Peppe Casa and Dario Marigliano – (first book and first unofficial biography), Roma, 1999.
 Rino Gaetano live (first official book and biography) by Emanuele Di Marco, 2001 
 Rino Gaetano by Yari Selvetella, 2001 
 Fontana chiara: omaggio a Rino Gaetano by Stefano Calò and Massimiliano Gentile, 2002
 Se mai qualcuno capirà Rino Gaetano by Alfredo Del Curatolo, 2003 
 Rino Gaetano: ma il cielo è sempre più blu (unreleased thoughts, stories and songs) by Massimo Cotto, 2004 
 "Rare tracce: ironie e canzoni di Rino Gaetano" by Silvia D'Ortenzi, Roma, Arcana, 2007. 
 "Sereno su gran parte del paese: una favola per Rino Gaetano" by Andrea Scoppetta, Padova, BeccoGiallo, 2009. 
 "Dizionario completo della Canzone Italiana" by Enrico Deregibus, Firenze, Giunti Editore, 2010.

External links

 
 Rino Gaetano at ondarock.it
 Critic biography
 Fan Site
 Fan Site
 "Una casa per Rino" – Crotone Music Festival
 "E io ci sto" – Rino Gaetano Day in Rome

1950 births
1981 deaths
Italian male singer-songwriters
People from Calabria
People from Crotone
Road incident deaths in Italy
20th-century Italian male singers